The 1979 Wightman Cup was the 51st edition of the annual women's team tennis competition between the United States and Great Britain. It was held in West Palm Beach, Florida in the United States.

References

Wightman Cups by year
Wightman Cup, 1979
Wightman Cup, 1979
Wightman Cup, 1979
Wightman Cup, 1979 
Wightman Cup, 1979